A stillborn is a baby born without signs of life.

Stillborn may also refer to:

 Stillborn (album), by Malevolent Creation, 1993
 Stillborn (band), a Polish heavy metal band
 "Stillborn" (song), by Black Label Society, 2003

Other uses
 Still/Born, 2017 film

See also
 Stillbirth (disambiguation)